Jan Jelte Ykema (born 18 April 1963) is a former ice speed skater from the Netherlands, who represented his native country at two consecutive Winter Olympics, starting in 1984 in Sarajevo, Yugoslavia. In 1988 (Calgary) he won the silver medal in the men's 500 metres. The same year he won all of his three World Cup races. A year later Ykema retired from international competition to work in real estate business. During his career he won three national sprint titles (1982, 1987 and 1988) and three distance titles.

After retiring from skating, Ykema became addicted to cocaine, and this addiction lasted for about 15 years.
After he recovered he started giving lessons at secondary schools about his addiction.
Source :

In 2008 he returned to competitive speed skating as assistant coach for the APPM team.

Records

Personal records

Source:

World records

Tournament overview

Source:

References

1963 births
Living people
Dutch male speed skaters
Speed skaters at the 1984 Winter Olympics
Speed skaters at the 1988 Winter Olympics
Olympic speed skaters of the Netherlands
Olympic silver medalists for the Netherlands
Sportspeople from Friesland
People from Harlingen, Netherlands
Olympic medalists in speed skating
Medalists at the 1988 Winter Olympics